The National Civil War Museum, located at One Lincoln Circle at Reservoir Park in Harrisburg, Pennsylvania, is a permanent, nonprofit educational institution created to promote the preservation of material culture and sources of information that are directly relevant to the American Civil War of 1861–1865, and the aftermath period of the war as related to Civil War Veterans' service organizations, including the Grand Army of the Republic, United Confederate Veterans and the Daughters of the Confederacy to 1920. The museum also serves as the National Headquarters for the Sons of Union Veterans of the Civil War (SUVCW), the legal successor to the Grand Army of the Republic (GAR). In 2009, the museum became affiliated with the Smithsonian Institution in Washington, D.C.

History
Former Harrisburg Mayor Steve Reed, a Civil War enthusiast, was behind the museum's development, which cost 32 million dollars. The museum opened to the public in 2001. It is now privately owned, and has an association with the Smithsonian Institution. Recently, the Museum published a book about the Union General Joshua Lawrence Chamberlain, one of many planned books the museum hopes to publish.

Location
The museum is located in a two-story brick building in Harrisburg's Reservoir Park in the Allison Hill neighborhood. The exhibits and self-guided tour begin on the second floor of the museum (first ten galleries) and continue on the first floor (last seven galleries and theater). A gift shop, temporary exhibit gallery, and museum support are on the first floor. A "Walk of Valor," consisting of red bricks bearing the names of Civil War veterans who have been honored by their surviving descendants, contributes to the museum's memorial-like grounds. It also shows pictures of the current president that was congratulating some of the honored veterans at a ceremony. The museum also serves as National Headquarters of the Sons of Union Veterans of the Civil War. Prices for entry are: Adults (18+) $15, Seniors (60+) $14, Students (6+) $13,
and a Family Pass is $48.

Exhibits
The museum's exhibits are designed to tell "the entire story of the American Civil War ... without bias to the Union or Confederate causes." The exhibition covers the period from 1850 to 1876, with its major focus on the Civil War years of 1861 to 1865. The majority of the collection of over 24,000 artifacts, photographs, documents, manuscripts, and other printed matter was acquired between 1994 and 1999 by the city of Harrisburg, under Mayor Stephen R. Reed, who is the museum's founder. Three-dimensional objects (artifacts) comprise about 3,500 items, of which one-fourth (850 items) are on display in the permanent galleries of the building.  The balance is held in secure storage for future exhibits and for scholarly research, the latter reserved for Museum members and by appointment only.

The museum's galleries are as follows:
 A House Divided, 1850–1860 (examines the events leading up to the Civil War); Highlights a speech given by Abraham Lincoln in Washington D.C. in 1860, in which he claimed that a house divided cannot stand. 
 American Slavery: The Peculiar Institution, 1850–1860 (how nineteenth-century Americans saw slavery);
 First Shots, April 1861 (Fort Sumter); The first battle and start of the war
 Making of Armies (recruiting, training, and equipping both armies);
 Weapons and Equipment (with many artifacts); Disease continued to cause most war deaths, but conscription and massive armies, more powerful and accurate weapons, and civilian targets increased casualties in the mid-1800 conflicts and later wars.
 Campaigns and Battles of 1861–1862 (early campaigns and the tactics, strategies. and logistics);
 Battle Map, 1861–1862 (emphasis on how geography and topography affected troop movements);
 Camp Curtin (the Civil War's largest Union camp, located in Harrisburg);
 Why Men Fought, 1861–1863 (motivations of soldiers on both sides);
 Civil War Music (displays of musical instruments and recorded music to listen to);
 Gettysburg, 1863 (a turning point of the war); Total casualties of nearly 50,000 men made it the largest battle ever on North American soil
 Women in the War (women's various roles);
 Navy (focuses on maritime engagements);
 Campaigns and Battles of 1864–1865 (the last years of the Civil War);
 Battle Map, 1863–1865 (from Stones River to Appomattox);
 Lincoln: War & Remembrance (remembering the Civil War, Abraham Lincoln, and veterans' roles after the war)

A video We the People focuses on ten characters from all walks of life and their fates before, during, and after the war. It is presented in segments in galleries 1, 4, 9, 14 and concludes in the theater.

Artifacts
The museum contains a large collection of original artifacts, including weapons, uniforms, camp and personal effects and similar items. Among the many articles on display are:

 The portable writing kit of General Winfield Scott
 1852 Sharps carbine and a pike head from the raid on Harper's Ferry
 The last battle map used by General Robert E. Lee during the Appomattox campaign
 The pen used by Governor Wise to sign John Brown's death warrant
 Lincoln's leather hat box used on the 1860 (first term) campaign trail
 Two of three know sabers of General J.E.B. Stuart's including one presented by his cousin on Stuart's wedding
 A sleeve of General George Pickett removed from his coat after he was wounded at the Battle of Gaines' Mill, traces of blood are visible
 Shadow box of relics once in possession of "Stonewall" Jackson, including hair from his horse, "Little Sorell", wood from his chair, and cloth from his desk
 Major General George McClellan's saddle, used when he was General-In-Chief of the Union army
 Lee's hat cord and Bible, inscribed in his hand, used for almost 20 years, until its capture four days before Lee's surrender at Appomattox
 A sword belt presented to General Ulysses S. Grant to commemorate the capture of Vicksburg
 A gauntlet worn by "Stonewall" Jackson earlier in the war
 A Bowie knife captured from one of "Mosby's Rangers"
 Doeskin riding gauntlets belonging to Lee
 A chair taken from the captured Confederate White House
 Kepi belonging to Major General Pickett
 A lock of hair belonging to and a post-war painting of General George Pickett passed down through his family
 A bullet-ridden fence post from along the Harrisburg Road in Gettysburg
 Various other rifles, revolvers, officer's swords, and munitions later discovered on battlefields
 Rare chains, iron shackles, and bracelets from the antebellum slave trade, including a slave collar with remnants of the original linen interior lining
 A wooden saddle and tack box used by Grant
 Memorabilia from Civil War veterans reunions
 A collection of memorabilia from Lincoln's assassination including a lock of Lincoln's hair, a sash from the funeral train, (the original) telegram ordering the arrest of John Wilkes Booth, a ticket to that night's production of Our American Cousin at Ford's Theatre, a replica of his "life mask", and a fragment of Mary Todd Lincoln's dress that she wore the night of the assassination
 The key to Libby Prison, a prison used for Federal officers
 Lead bullets, complete with teeth marks, given to patients in anticipation of pain during surgery
 Stateroom plaque inscribed "D.G. Farragut, USN" carried by him from stateroom to stateroom during his naval career
 A Lincoln administration china plate and a lantern from Lincoln's home in Springfield, Illinois

See also
 National Civil War Naval Museum at Port Columbus
 National World War I Museum
 National World War II Museum
 New England Civil War Museum

References

External links 
 

Museums in Harrisburg, Pennsylvania
Pennsylvania in the American Civil War
American Civil War museums in Pennsylvania
Pennsylvania
Buildings and structures completed in 2001
2001 establishments in Pennsylvania